Beebe is an unincorporated community located in the town of Bennett, Douglas County, Wisconsin, United States. The town has a post office.

The community was named for Dr. Casper V. Beebe, who established a medical practice in Superior in the late 1870s.

Notes

Unincorporated communities in Douglas County, Wisconsin
Unincorporated communities in Wisconsin